Tristar Air was an Egyptian cargo airline headquartered in Cairo with its base at Cairo International Airport.

History 
The airline was established in 1998 and started operations in September that year. It was owned by the Messeh family; Sobhy Abd El Messeh (98%), Sabry Botros Messeh (1%), and Fortunee Botros Messeh (1%) and employed 80 staff. On 12 October 2015, the airline lost its only aircraft in the accident mentioned below and was forced to suspend all operations subsequently.

Destinations
The airline operated scheduled cargo services linking Cairo with Amsterdam in addition to cargo charter flights to various destinations.

Fleet

As of 15 October 2015, Tristar Air did no longer operate any aircraft. Previously it owned one single Airbus A300B4-200F.

Accidents and incidents
 On 12 October 2015, a Tristar Air Airbus A300-B4F was forced to land on a road near Aden Adde International Airport in Mogadishu, Somalia. Somali Authorities reported the aircraft had attempted several approaches to the airport but had gone around each time because the flight crew lost visual reference to the runway. The flight departed late from Cairo, and as a consequence reached Moghadishu after sunset. The airfield does not have runway lights and is closed from sunset until sunrise. After several attempts, the flight had run out of fuel, making the emergency landing necessary. Of the six people on board the cargo flight incoming from Ostend in Belgium, two received minor injuries in the landing while the aircraft sustained substantial damage beyond economic repair.

References

External links

	

Defunct airlines of Egypt
Airlines established in 1998
Airlines disestablished in 2015
2015 disestablishments in Egypt
Egyptian companies established in 1998